The Mercedes-Benz Ocean Drive is a concept car introduced in 2007. The car is built on the S600 chassis (S600 is long wheelbase only).

The soft top is made of textile, and can be opened or closed within 20 seconds. Each of the four seats has been fitted with the AIRSCARF system, which blows a stream of warm air out of the neckrest. This system debuted on the 2004 SLK Roadster and was also available from 2008 on the facelifted SL Roadster.

At this moment nothing has been said on the future for this car. What has been announced though, is that Mercedes will attempt to give the new S-Class (in 2012) 7 different models. A most likely overview for the new S-Class range could then consist of:

S SWB (Short Wheel Base)
S LWB (Long Wheel Base)
S Coupe (formerly known as CL-Coupe, Mercedes changed several names including CLK to E and CL to S)
S Convertible (based on the S Coupe model)
S Convertible (likely to be the Ocean Drive Concept)
S Pullman (limousine following previous Pullman models)

Sources 
 Edmunds

See also
List of Mercedes-Benz vehicles

External links 

 2007 Mercedes-Benz Ocean Drive Concept, Automobile Magazine
 Offen für Vier, Focus online (in German)

Ocean Drive